Ayni is a jamoat in Tajikistan. It is located in Varzob District, one of the Districts of Republican Subordination. The jamoat has a total population of 14,052 (2015). Villages: Bakavul, Bakavuli Nav, Buvak, Guliston, Dara, Dashti Miron, Oriyono, Oghurti, Purzobod, Toshbuloq, Kharangoni Bolo, Kharangoni Miyona, Chinor, Sharshara, Sheykhak, Yakkachashma.

References

Populated places in Districts of Republican Subordination
Jamoats of Tajikistan